Box Elder Canyon is a canyon located within the western slopes of the Wellsville Mountains, a branch of the Wasatch Range of the Rocky Mountains in the State of Utah, United States.

Description

The valley was created by a prehistoric river, which flowed as a tributary into the main pool of ancient Lake Bonneville, emerging east of present-day Brigham City.

In addition to US‑89/US‑91, Box Elder Canyon also contains Box Elder Creek, which flows westward from Mantua Reservoir, a moderately-sized water impoundment created in 1961 through the construction of an earthen-fill dam at the upper mouth of the canyon, adjacent to the small farming community of Mantua (pronounced by locals as "Man-a-way"). From Mantua, US‑89/US‑91 enters Dry Canyon for  before the combined routes reach their apex at Sardine Summit. From there, the highway enters a mountain valley known as Dry Lake before traversing Wellsville Canyon (popularly but incorrectly called "Sardine Canyon") before entering the Cache Valley at Wellsville.

See also

 List of valleys of Utah

References

Landforms of Box Elder County, Utah
Canyons and gorges of Utah